Heinicke is a German surname. Notable people with this surname include:

Bettina Heinicke née Bettina Blumenberg (born 1962), German field hockey player
Bianca Heinicke (born 1993), German web video producer
Erika Heinicke (born 1939), German speed skater
Herbert Heinicke (1905–1988), German chess master born in Brazil
Hermann Heinicke (1863–1949), German-born violinist and music teacher in South Australia
Megan Heinicke, known as Megan Tandy (born 1988), a Canadian biathlete
Samuel Heinicke (1727–1790), German pioneer of education for the deaf
Taylor Heinicke (born 1993), American football quarterback
Victoria Heinicke née Victoria Palmer, American tennis player

See also
Heinecke a similar surname

German-language surnames